Tal Hajj Ali (also Romanized as Tall Ḩājj ʿAlī) is a village in Hati Rural District, Hati District, Lali County, Khuzestan Province, Iran. At the 2006 census, its population was 115, in 19 families.

References 

Populated places in Lali County